Brooklands is a suburb in the north of Nelson, New Zealand. Nelson's largest cemetery, Wakapuaka Cemetery, is located in Brooklands.

References

Suburbs of Nelson, New Zealand
Populated places in the Nelson Region